Quercus sumatrana is an oak native to the islands of Sumatra and Borneo in Indonesia and Malaysia. On Borneo, it is reported from Sarawak, Sabah and East Kalimantan. It is placed in subgenus Cerris, section Cyclobalanopsis.

References

sumatrana
Trees of Sumatra
Plants described in 1966
Trees of Borneo
Flora of the Borneo lowland rain forests